Chunchi is a location in the Chimborazo Province, Ecuador. It is the seat of the Chunchi Canton.

References 
 www.inec.gov.ec
 www.ame.gov.ec

External links 
 Map of the Chimborazo Province

Populated places in Chimborazo Province